The Gailey Hollow Farmstead is a historic farm on Gailey Hollow Road in rural southern Benton County, Arkansas, north of Logan.  The farm complex consists of a house and six outbuildings, and is a good example of an early 20th-century farmstead.   The main house is a T-shaped double pen frame structure,  stories tall, with a wide shed-roof dormer across the roof of the main facade.  There are shed-roof porches on either side of the rear projecting T section; the house is finished in weatherboard.  The outbuildings include a barn, garage, carriage house, smoke house, chicken house, and grain crib.

The property was listed on the National Register of Historic Places in 1988.

See also
National Register of Historic Places listings in Benton County, Arkansas

References

Houses on the National Register of Historic Places in Arkansas
Houses completed in 1910
Houses in Benton County, Arkansas
National Register of Historic Places in Benton County, Arkansas
1910 establishments in Arkansas
Double pen architecture in the United States
Farms on the National Register of Historic Places in Arkansas